

Events

Works

Births

Deaths
 Ibn Jubayr (born 1145), geographer, traveler and poet from al-Andalus
 Gyōi (born 1177), Japanese poet and Buddhist monk

See also

Poetry
 List of years in poetry

13th-century poetry
Poetry